Grant Stott (born 13 May 1967) is a Scottish broadcaster from Edinburgh. He formerly worked as a DJ on Edinburgh radio station Forth 1 until January 2017. He then joined BBC Radio Scotland and now appears on the television soap opera River City. Stott is the brother of television presenter John Leslie.

Television career
Grant's television career began with presenting the BBC Scotland educational series Let's See: Go 4 5 with Sally Gray in 1992 and 1993, He also presented BBC Scotland's coverage of Children in Need for five consecutive years between 1992 and 1997.

In 1993 he joined Scottish Television and presented children's show Wemyss Bay 902101. with Arlene Stuart, The first children's series of Now You See it which aired as part of Wemyss Bay 90210 and Vox-Pops on the lunchtime edition of Scotland Today. In 1994–96, Grant presented Children's BBC Scotland with Gail Porter in the school holidays. From 1995 to 1997 He also used to present the first three series of BBC Scotland weekend children's show, Fully Booked, the final two series of BBC Scotland magazine show MegaMag in 1995 and 1996 and guest presented an episode of Jackanory in 1995. For many years Stott presented BBC Scotland schools programme, See You See Me. Many of the episodes were recorded with Wilma Kennedy. Episodes included studying maps, the Vikings, Romans and the 1960s.

Other television credits include Late Flyte, The Flyer, Backstage and Offside for BBC Choice Scotland. Take the High Road, Scottish Passport, Under the Hammer and Grow for it for Scottish Television and Grampian Television.

Stott rejoined Scottish Television (now STV) in the Autumn of 2006, to co-host Scotsport alongside Andy Walker, after the departure of Jim Delahunt. The programme was cancelled in May 2008, due to increasing competition from BBC Scotland's Sportscene. On Hogmanay 2007, Grant fronted a special programme, 50 Years of Scotsport, with Michelle Watt, Stott also presented STV's Hogmanay Live from Edinburgh, which was broadcast for 20 minutes from 23:50.

Having focused on his radio career and regular pantomime appearances during the 2010's, Stott returned to a regular television role in 2021, playing Sam Spiller in the BBC Scotland soap opera River City.

Stage credits

Pantomimes
Stott is also known for his yearly pantomimes at the King's Theatre in Edinburgh. In 2006, he starred alongside Allan Stewart and Andy Gray in a production of Cinderella. Appearances include:

’’Robinson Crusoe’’ as Blackheart, 2009, King’s Theatre, Edinburgh 
’’Jack and the Beanstalk’’ as Fleshcreep, 2010, King’s Theatre, Edinburgh 
Cinderella as Gobina McPhlegm, 2011, King's Theatre, Edinburgh
Mother Goose as Demon Vanity, 2012, King's Theatre, Edinburgh
Peter Pan as Captain Hook, 2013, King's Theatre, Edinburgh
Aladdin as Abanazar, 2014, King's Theatre, Edinburgh
’’Snow White and the Seven Dwarfs as Queen Sadista, 2015, King’s Theatre Edinburgh 
Jack and the Beanstalk as Fleshcreep, 2016, King's Theatre, Edinburgh
Cinderella as Baroness Hibernia Hardup, 2017, King's Theatre, Edinburgh
Beauty and the Beast as Flash Boaby, 2018, King's Theatre, Edinburgh
Goldilocks and the Three Bears as Baron Von Winklebottom, 2019, King’s Theatre, Edinburgh
’’Sleeping Beauty’’ as Carabosse, 2021, King’s Theatre, Edinburgh

Other appearances
Stott writes a column for the Edinburgh Evening News, and also writes another weekly column in the sports section commenting about his love of Hibernian FC.

He has also featured in an advertising campaign with the Edinburgh-based bus company Lothian Buses.

Stott performed a song at the Radio Forth Awards 2011 titled "That's Fife" (a cover of "That's Life") a tribute to Fife, mocking various towns, landmarks and famous Fife people. It since has had over 200,000 views on YouTube.

He had a show on Forth 1 on Monday to Friday from 10:00 to 14:00 however, he left in January 2017.

Philanthropy
Grant raising money for Leukaemia Research in memory of Moray Fotheringham, by cycling and is a patron of the Edinburgh-based charity, 'It's good 2 give'.

References

External links
Grant Stott's Vinyl Collective (BBC Radio Scotland)
Panto Villain website
Grant's Stand at stv.tv
Grant Stott on Forth one

BBC Radio Scotland presenters
British radio DJs
Living people
Television personalities from Edinburgh
Scottish television presenters
Scottish association football commentators
1967 births